Yartsevo is a rural locality (a village) in Malyshevskoye Rural Settlement, Selivanovsky District, Vladimir Oblast, Russia. The population was 27 as of 2010.

Geography 
Yartsevo is located on the Ushna River, 19 km southwest from Krasnaya Gorbatka (the district's administrative centre) by road. Krasnaya Ushna is the nearest rural locality.

References 

Rural localities in Selivanovsky District